Mompha epilobiella is a moth in the family Momphidae found in Europe and North America.

Description
The wingspan is 10–13 mm. Adults are on wing throughout the year, but are most common in July and August in Great Britain.

The larvae have been recorded feeding on rosebay willowherb (Chamerion angustifolium), great willowherb (Epilobium hirsutum), broad-leaved willowherb (Epilobium montanum), marsh willowherb (Epilobium palustre)  and evening primrose (Oenothera species), but great willowherb is the main food plant. The other listed plants might be misidentifications. Young larvae probably live as leaf miners. Older larvae live, mostly communally, in spun uppermost leaves.

Distribution
It has a Holarctic distribution, found in North America, including Ontario and all of Europe.

References

External links
 Bug Guide

Momphidae
Leaf miners
Moths described in 1775
Moths of Europe
Moths of North America
Taxa named by Michael Denis
Taxa named by Ignaz Schiffermüller